"People Get Ready" is a 1965 song written by Curtis Mayfield and first recorded by the Impressions.

People Get Ready may also refer to:

 People Get Ready (The Impressions album), 1965
 People Get Ready: The Curtis Mayfield Story, a box set by Curtis Mayfield, 1996
 People Get Ready (The Mooney Suzuki album), 2000
 People Get Ready (PE 2.0 album), 2014
 People Get Ready – A Tribute to Curtis Mayfield, 1993 tribute album
 People Get Ready, an album by The Chambers Brothers, 1965
 People Get Ready, an album by Russell Watson, 2008
 People Get Ready (band), an American rock band